Chilakalapudi Halt railway station (station code: CLU) is the penultimate railway station on the Gudivada–Machilipatnam branch line, serving the rail needs of Chilakalapudi. This railway station is administered under Vijayawada railway division of South Coast Railway Zone.

References 

Railway stations in Vijayawada railway division
Railway stations in Krishna district